The 1977 Jordanian  League (known as The Jordanian  League,   was the 27th season of Jordan  League since its inception in 1944.In the 1977 it was called (first division league).  Al-Faisaly won its 17th title, Al-Faisaly won the championship after a title play-off match with Al-Jeel (2-1).

Teams

Map

League table 

 Al-Faisaly  won the championship after a title play-off match with Al-Jeel (2-1).

Overview
Al-Faysali won the championship.

References
RSSSF

External links
 Jordan Football Association website

Jordanian Pro League seasons
Jordan
Jordan
football